Papanikolaou or Papanicolaou is a Greek patronymic surname, meaning "child of Father Nikolaos", used in Greece and Cyprus.

It may refer to:

People 
 Christos Papanikolaou (born 1941), Greek pole vaulter
 Dimitris Papanikolaou (born 1977), Greek basketball player
 George C. Papanicolaou (born 1943), Greek-American mathematician
 Georgios Papanikolaou (1883-1962), Greek doctor, inventor of the pap smear test
 John Paul Papanicolaou (1949-2010), Greek businessman
 Kostas Papanikolaou, Greek basketball player in the National Basketball Association
 Miltiadis Papanikolaou (born 1947), Professor of History of Arts, Aristotle University of Thessaloniki
 Nikos Papanikolaou (born 1985), Greek basketball player

Other 
 Papanicolaou stain, a histological technique
 Papanicolaou test, a gynecological test

Greek-language surnames
Surnames
Patronymic surnames